Viatilingam a/l Murgeson (c.1952 – 1 April 2012) was a former Malaysian football player. His name sometimes spelt as M. Viatilingam or M. Vittilinggam. He played as a left-back.

Career
Viatilingam played for Kedah FA, starting in the youth team that contested the Burnley Cup from 1968 to 1970, and later for the senior team in Malaysia Cup tournaments from 1971 to 1984.

He also played for the Malaysia national football team, debuting in the 1975 SEAP Games. He was in the squad that played in the 1976 AFC Asian Cup in Tehran, Iran. The 1978 Asian Games was the last tournament he played for Malaysia.

He was known to his teammates as 'Mat Boeing' due to his speed, like the aircraft.

He was also a full-time staff at Lembaga Letrik Negara (currently known as Tenaga Nasional Berhad), along with his childhood friend and teammate in Kedah and Malaysia, Khor Sek Leng (later known as Mohd Azraai Khor Abdullah). He worked at LLN/TNB from 1972 to 2008.

Death
Viatilingam died at Pantai Hospital, Penang on 1 April 2012 caused by brain tumor. At 60 years old at the time of his death, Viatilingam leaves behind his only son V.Thanabalan, as his wife had died 8 months earlier.

External links
 Former national footballer M. Viatilingam, 60, dies
 Mat Boeing -- the speed legend

References

People from Kedah
Malaysian footballers
Malaysia international footballers
2012 deaths
Kedah Darul Aman F.C. players
1976 AFC Asian Cup players
1950s births
Malaysian sportspeople of Indian descent
Malaysian Hindus
Tamil sportspeople
Malaysian people of Tamil descent
Association football defenders